Spuleria is a genus of moths of the family Elachistidae. It contains only one species Spuleria flavicaput, which is found in most of Europe and Anatolia.

Taxonomy
Some authors list the genus as a synonym of Chrysoclista. If valid, the genus is mostly placed in the family Elachistidae, but other authors list it as a member of the family Agonoxenidae, Cosmopterigidae or Blastodacnidae.

Description of Spuleria flavicaput 
The wingspan is 12–14 mm. The head is orange-yellow. Palpi yellow, basal half blackish, terminal joint very short. Forewings are purplish-black; plical and second discal stigmata black, raised. Hindwings are dark fuscous. The larva is slender and whitish. Adults are diurnal, i.e. flying in the morning from May to June.

Biology
The larvae feed on hawthorn (Crataegus monogyna) and midland hawthorn (Crataegus laevigata). They mine the young twigs of their host plant in summer and autumn. Pupation takes place in the mine. Before pupation, the larva seal the mine entrance with a spinning. Larvae can be found from September to March or April.

References

External links
 
 

Elachistidae
Leaf miners
Monotypic moth genera
Moths described in 1828
Moths of Europe
Moths of Asia
Taxa named by Adrian Hardy Haworth
Taxa named by Ottmar Hofmann